Pha Chuk is a tambon (subdistrict) of Mueang Uttaradit District, in Uttaradit Province, Thailand. In 2019 it had a total population of 8,125 people.

Administration

Central administration
The tambon is subdivided into 14 administrative villages (muban).

Local administration
The whole area of the subdistrict is covered by the subdistrict municipality (Thesaban Tambon) Pha Chuk (เทศบาลตำบลผาจุก).

References

External links
Thaitambon.com on Pha Chuk

Tambon of Uttaradit province
Populated places in Uttaradit province